The Port of Tanga is the second largest port in Tanzania.

Operations
At present, the port is served by three shipping lines: Delmas, Mitsui O.S.K. Lines and Inchcape.

Tanzania-Uganda Pipeline 

on 6 March 2016 Tanzania president John Magufuli and Uganda president Yoweri Museveni agreed to construct the Tanzania-Uganda oil pipeline at the 17th East African Heads of State summit in Arusha . As of 2016, the pipeline was to run for 1,400 km from Lake Albert basin to the port of Tanga. The pipeline was initially agreed to run from Uganda to Kenya to the Lamu Port and Lamu-Southern Sudan-Ethiopia Transport Corridor. The pipeline was to cost over $4 billion and to provide 1,500 direct jobs across the region. The three companies with a stake in the project are Total S.A., China National Offshore Oil Corporation and Tullow Oil, who preferred the Tanzanian route due to safety concerns in the Kenyan Northern corridor. The construction was to begin in August 2016 and will take two years to build.

References

External links

Tanga
Buildings and structures in the Tanga Region
Geography of Tanga Region